Katihar Medical College (KMC) is a medical college situated in the city of Katihar in the Indian state of Bihar. Katihar Medical College offers undergraduate courses in Bachelor of Medicine and Bachelor of Surgery (MBBS) and post-graduate courses (MD/MS And PG Diploma) in almost all Clinical and Non-Clinical Subjects. The college was established and is maintained by the Patna-based Al-Karim Educational Trust.

Campus
The library houses over 16,000 books and has subscriptions to 51 Indian and 57 foreign journals. A 500-seat college auditorium is used for cultural programs and seminars run by the college. The college also hosts a 600-bed general hospital staffed by 331 doctors and 175 nurses. The teacher student ratio is 1:2.

Administration
The college was established in 1987 by the Patna-based Al-Karim Educational Trust with the objective of providing specialised medical facilities for the region. Ahmad Ashfaque Karim is the chairman and managing director of the college and also the Founder Chairman of its parent Al-Karim Education Trust. The Principal of the college is Dr. Ram Bilas Gupta

Admission
The college admits 150 Bachelor of Medicine and Bachelor of Surgery (MBBS) students annually. Candidates are selected on the basis of their performance in the National Eligibility and Entrance Test. Sixty percent, 25 percent, and 15 percent of seats are reserved for the Muslim community, general category, and Non-Resident Indian candidates, respectively. It is the only private medical college of Bihar to have a Non-Resident Indian quota.

References

External links

Al-Karim University | Katihar 
LORD BUDDHA KOSHI MEDICAL COLLEGE AND HOSPITAL 
List of institutions of higher education in Bihar
List of medical colleges in India

Katihar
Medical colleges in Bihar
1987 establishments in Bihar
Educational institutions established in 1987
Hospitals in Bihar
Medical Council of India
Private medical colleges in India
Hospitals established in 1987
Research institutes in Bihar